Han, hun og Hamlet (He, She, and Hamlet) is a 1932 Danish comedy film directed by Lau Lauritzen Sr.

Cast
Marguerite Viby as Eva
Hans W. Petersen as Evas kæreste
Olga Svendsen as Institutsbestyrerinde
Christian Arhoff as Teaterdirektøren
Erna Schrøder as Skuespillerinde
Jørgen Lund as Skipper
Einar Juhl as Regissør
Arthur Jensen as Sømand
Christian Schrøder as Evas far
Willy Bille
Johannes Andresen as Sømand
Henry Nielsen as Sømand
Alex Suhr as Fordrukken sømand
Carl Schenstrøm as Fyrtaarnet
Harald Madsen as Bivognen
Solveig Sundborg
Tove Wallenstrøm as Pupil at the girls' boarding school
Aage Bendixen as Short sailor
Poul Reichhardt as Sømand i hængekøje (uncredited)

External links

1932 films
1932 comedy films
1930s Danish-language films
Danish black-and-white films
Films directed by Lau Lauritzen Sr.
Danish comedy films
1930s buddy comedy films